These are The Official Charts Company UK Official Indie Chart number one hits of 1991.

See also
1991 in music

References

United Kingdom Indie Singles
Indie 1991
UK Indie Chart number-one singles